Electronic City is an information technology hub in Bangalore, India, located in Anekal taluk. It is one of India's largest electronic/IT industrial parks, spread over 800 acres (3.2 km²) in Konappana Agrahara and Doddathogur villages.

Electronic City was established by KEONICS (Karnataka State Electronics Development Corporation), and consists of four zones called phases – Phase I, Phase II, Phase III and Phase IV. There are approximately 200 IT/ITES company campuses located in Electronic City, including main campuses of Infosys, Wipro, TCS, HCL, Tech Mahindra and Biocon.

History

Electronic City was the brainchild of R. K. Baliga, the first Chairman and Managing Director of Keonics, Karnataka Electronic. He dreamt of making Bangalore the Silicon Valley of India when he developed the concept of Electronic City. In 1978, Keonics established Electronic City on 332 acres of land in Konappana Agrahara and Doddathogur villages. The liberalisation of the Indian economy in the early 1990s by the then Indian Prime Minister P.V. Narasimha Rao and then Indian Finance Minister Dr. Manmohan Singh helped Electronic City to become what it is today — the outsourcing capital of the world.

In 1997, the maintenance and upkeep of Electronic City was handed over by Keonics to ELCIA, the Electronic City Industries Association, with representatives from units in the enclave, for effective local governance and management. Security is provided by ELCIA, who have deployed around 500 security officials and also installed CCTV cameras on strategic locations. On 18 March 2013, a notification by the Urban Development Department has brought Electronic City Phases I, II, III under the E-City Industrial Township Area. The residential area within  Electronic City are still under the governance of Gram Panchayats and awaiting BBMP inclusion for want of civic amenities.

Connectivity and transport
Electronic City has developed infrastructure in terms of connectivity to other important localities of Bangalore city. Electronic City which was once considered a suburban area, is now considered as part of the city due to the development and connectivity.

Road
BMTC bus services are the most popular mode of transport. There are many  BMTC buses starting from Electronic City Bustand (near Hosur Road), Wipro Gate and Infosys Gate ply to all important part of the city. There are buses from E-City upto KIA. There are frequent BMTC services to Bannerghatta Road, Silk Board, Brigade Road, Attibele, Kengeri, K R Market, KBS etc. Most auto-rickshaws in Electronic City do not charge by the meter and hence an avoidable mode of transport.

Hosur Road 
Electronic City is on Hosur Road which is a major arterial highway of Bangalore city. Many BMTC buses and interstate buses use this route.

Elevated Expressway 

The four-lane mixed corridor elevated highway from Silk Board junction to Electronic City was opened on 22 January 2010. The 9.985 km long expressway is one of the longest elevated national highways in the country. This elevated stretch helps a commuter reach Electronic City from Silk Board is 30 minutes. Toll for this route is revised periodically. This expressway has been accident prone with many fatal accidents on the narrow lanes resulting in vehicles falling down from the height, posing high risk to the traffic on the highway below. BTP speed checks are common on this route. Bengaluru Traffic Police has arrested several bike wheelies on this route at late night hours.

NICE Road
The NICE road connects Electronic City to other key areas in the west of Bengaluru city like Bannerghatta Road, Mysore Road, Kanakapura Road and Tumkur Road. This is a 63 km 4-lane access controlled tollway.

Rail

Metro rail 
Electronic City comes under the Namma Metro Yellow Line (R V Road - Bommasandra line). The project is near completion and services are expected to start by June 2023.

Suburban rail 
The Heelalige railway station, about 4 km from Electronic City Phase 2, has become part of the Bengaluru Suburban Rail (Bengaluru Commuter Rail) system. The South Western Railways has introduced a fleet of Diesel Multiple Units (DMUs) on this route. The nearest railway stations are Heelalige, which is 6 km from Electronic City, or Karmelaram railway station which is 14 km away.

Air

Bengaluru Airport
KIA  is located 56 km away from Electronic City. Travelling time from Electronic City to KIA: 2 hours by road in normal traffic,  ~ 1.5 hours during late nights 12 am to 6 am, and about 3 hrs during peak traffic.

Hosur Airport
The proposed Hosur Airport in Belagondapalli on Thally Road, an UDAN project, is expected to be nearer to Electronic City. Travelling time:  30 minutes by road. Distance from Electronics City: 28 km

Heli Taxis
Helicopter taxi service to Kempegowda International Airport was launched in March 2018 but stopped during COVID-19 due to operational issues.  . The high fare and limited access to helipad(s) make heli-taxis affordable only for industrialists and business travellers.

Emergency Services 

 E-City Police Station
 BTP - Bangalore City Traffic Police
 CISF - Central Industrial Security Force Electronic City
 Electronic City Fire Station
 Electronic City Post Office

References

External links

Electronic City Bangalore

1978 establishments in Karnataka
Information technology industry of Bangalore
Industrial parks in India
Business parks of India
Neighbourhoods in Bangalore
High-technology business districts in India